Hans-Jürgen Heise (6 July 1930 - 13 November 2013) was a German author and poet.

Biography 
Heise was born Hans-Jürgen Scheller in Bublitz, Pomerania, Weimar Germany (modern Bobolice, Poland). His family moved to Berlin when he was still an infant but returned to Bublitz because of the Allied bombing of Berlin in World War II.

In 1945 Heise s family fled from Pomerania. Heise started to work as a journalist in Berlin and later became a lector at the University of Kiel

Hans-Jürgen Heise died in Kiel.

Publications 
Vorboten einer neuen Steppe, 1961
Wegloser Traum, 1964
Worte aus der Zentrifuge, 1966
Ein bewohnbares Haus, 1968
Küstenwind, 1969
Uhrenvergleich, 1971
Underseas Possessions, 1972
Das Profil unter der Maske (Essays), 1974
Meine kleine Freundin Schizophrenia, 1981
Bilder und Klänge aus al-Andalus. Höhepunkte spanischer Literatur und Kunst. (Essays), 1986
Der Macho und der Kampfhahn. Unterwegs in Spanien und Lateinamerika. (Reisebericht), 1987
Die zweite Entdeckung Amerikas. Annäherungen an die Literatur des lateinamerikanischen Subkontinents (Essays), 1987
Ein Galgen für den Dichter. Stichworte zur Lyrik (Essays), 1990
Katzen fallen auf die Beine (Kurzprosa), 1993
Zwischenhoch, 1997
Ein Fax von Basho, 2000
Wenn das Blech als Trompete aufwacht. Schlüsselfiguren der Moderne (Essays), 2000
Die Zeit kriegt Zifferblatt und Zeiger. Autobiografische Stationen und ein verschattetes Reiseziel, 2003
Das Zyklopenauge der Vernunft, 2005

Awards 
Andreas Gryphius Prize, 1973
Kulturpreis of the City of Kiel, 1974
Malta Cultural Award, 1976)
 "kultur aktuell", 1988
honorary guest of the Villa Massimo, 1989
Pomeranian Culture Award, 1993
Andreas Gryphius Prize, 1994
Kunstpreis of the land of Schleswig-Holstein, 2002

References 

1930 births
2013 deaths
People from Koszalin County
People from the Province of Pomerania
German male poets
20th-century German poets
German-language poets
20th-century German male writers